Pierre Prosper Garven, Jr. (October 27, 1925 – October 19, 1973) was an American judge who was Chief Justice of the New Jersey Supreme Court for seven weeks in 1973.

Son of Bayonne mayor Pierre P. Garven, Garven was appointed by Governor of New Jersey William T. Cahill, after having served as an associate justice of the same court for several months.

He took office as chief justice on September 1, 1973. Garven died of a stroke on October 19, 1973. He was survived by five children and his wife, Sandra.  Garven was succeeded as Chief Justice by Richard J. Hughes, the only person ever to serve as both Governor and chief justice of New Jersey.

References

1925 births
1973 deaths
Chief Justices of the Supreme Court of New Jersey
20th-century American judges